How to Fix a Drug Scandal is an American true crime documentary miniseries that was released on Netflix on April 1, 2020. The premise revolves around documentary filmmaker Erin Lee Carr following the effects of crime drug lab chemists Sonja Farak and Annie Dookhan and their tampering with evidence and its aftereffects.

Dookhan was accused of forging reports and tampering with samples to produce desired results. Farak was accused of tampering with the evidence she was tasked with analyzing by using it to get high herself. The actions of both women, who acted independently, resulted in tens of thousands of drug counts being dismissed, the largest single mass dismissal of criminal cases in U.S. history. How to Fix a Drug Scandal depicts the role of former Attorney General of Massachusetts Martha Coakley, who was accused of political cover up.

Release 
How to Fix a Drug Scandal was released on April 1, 2020, on Netflix.

References

External links
 
 

2020 American television series debuts
2020 American television series endings
2020s American documentary television series
English-language Netflix original programming
Netflix original documentary television series
Documentary television series about crime in the United States
Television shows set in Massachusetts